Pambotadae or Pambotadai was a deme of ancient Attica, originally of the phyle of Erechtheis and after 127/8 AD the phyle of Hadrianis, sending one delegate every two years, to the Athenian Boule, with Sybridae sending its delegate in lieu of Pambotadae in intervening years until 307/6 BC, after which Pambotadae sent a delegate each year, and after 224/3 BC, two delegates each year. 

Its site is unlocated.

References

Populated places in ancient Attica
Former populated places in Greece
Demoi
Lost ancient cities and towns